Gary Alexander Goldstone (born 24 July 1976 in Durban) is a South African association football defender for Premier Soccer League club Bloemfontein Celtic.

Previous clubs: Cherrians Football Club, Maritzburg United, AmaZulu, Ajax Cape Town, Kaizer Chiefs

References

1976 births
South African soccer players
Living people
Bloemfontein Celtic F.C. players
Sportspeople from Durban
Kaizer Chiefs F.C. players
Association football defenders
Maritzburg United F.C. players
AmaZulu F.C. players
Manning Rangers F.C. players